Jay Phillip Obernolte (born August 18, 1970) is an American politician, businessman, and video game developer serving as the U.S. representative for  since 2021, when it was numbered as the 8th district. A Republican, he was previously a member of the California State Assembly representing the 33rd district. Before serving in the Assembly, Obernolte served in the city council and was the mayor of Big Bear Lake, California. He is the owner, president, and technical director of FarSight Studios, an American video game developer.

Early life and education
Obernolte was born in Chicago, Illinois, and raised in Fresno, California. He graduated as valedictorian of Edison/Computech High School in 1988. In 1992, he obtained his Bachelor of Science degree in engineering and applied science from the California Institute of Technology and in 1997, he received his Master of Science in artificial intelligence from the University of California, Los Angeles. In 2020, he was awarded a Doctorate in Public Administration from the California Baptist University with a dissertation on "Managing Budgetary Conflict Between the Executive and Legislative Branches of Government".

Career

Business 
In 1990, Obernolte launched FarSight Studios, an independent developer and publisher of family-friendly video games. The company originally produced games for the Nintendo Entertainment System, and as of 2022 develops for PlayStation 4, Xbox One, Nintendo Switch, Windows, macOS, iOS and Android. Notable games the studio has developed include Game Party, Hotel for Dogs, The Pinball Arcade, and the Sega Genesis version of Action 52. FarSight Studios claims Sony, Microsoft, Google, and Apple among its clients and employs 25 workers.

Politics
In 2005, Obernolte was elected to the Big Bear City Airport Board, where he served for five years. He then served as president of the board for three years and as vice president for one year.

In 2010, Obernolte was elected to Big Bear City Council, where he served as mayor. He also served on the Big Bear Lake Fire Protection Board, as director of the Mojave Desert and on the Mountain Integrated Waste JPA Board, the Mountain Area Regional Transit Authority Board, and the League of California Cities Desert-Mountain Division.

Obernolte served as State Assemblyman for California's 33rd State Assembly district, which encompasses a wide expanse of the High Desert (areas of the Mojave Desert), from the eastern fringes of the Los Angeles metropolitan area to the Nevada and Arizona borders, from 2014 to 2020. He was elected to Congress in 2020 to replace Paul Cook as representative for California's 8th congressional district, which includes Mono County, Inyo County, and the majority of land mass in San Bernardino County.

California State Assembly
In January 2016, Obernolte was elected to serve on the California Legislative Technology and Innovation Caucus, which is co-chaired by Assembly members Ian Calderon and Evan Low. He also sat on the following committees: Arts, Entertainment, Sports, Tourism, and Internet Media as vice chair; Budget as vice chair; Appropriations; Budget Subcommittee 6 on Budget Process, Oversight and Program Evaluation; Budget Subcommittee 6 on Budget Process, Oversight and Program Evaluation; Utilities and Commerce; Joint Committee on Arts; and Joint Legislative Budget.

In 2016, Obernolte expressed concern over Frontier Communications's acquisition of Verizon's voice, video, data, and FiOS network, saying that the takeover "negatively affected" his constituents through poor landline telephone service.

In 2016, Obernolte introduced Assembly Bill 2341, which would provide San Bernardino and other rural counties with additional judges to resolve backlogged court systems. The bill would have shifted seats from Santa Clara and Alameda counties to the counties in San Bernardino, but died in the Senate Appropriations Committee without a hearing.

In 2017, Obernolte opposed Xavier Becerra's nomination as California Attorney General.

Obernolte said that Governor Jerry Brown's $179.45 billion budget proposal was "responsible", but expressed a preference for fixing existing programs over creating new ones. He also stated an interest in funding job skills training, improving the state's Denti-Cal program, repairing infrastructure, and working on the housing crisis. Obernolte pushed for lawmakers to limit long-term funding commitments and said the budget proposal did nothing to address the "state's out-of-control pension debts and retiree health care liabilities."

Obernolte co-authored Assembly Bill 1103, which would have allowed California bicyclists to roll through stop signs if it was safe to do so (the "Idaho stop"). The bill died in committee.

Obernolte authored Assembly Bill 1642, which would extend the deadlines to either pay the fire tax, which is a state fire prevention fee, or file a petition for redetermination from 30 days to 60 days. In July 2017, the fire fee was suspended as part of Assembly Bill 398. Obernolte opposed raising fire insurance costs, which is calculated by factors in the risk of wildfire, fuels, slope and road access for emergency vehicles.

Obernolte opposed increases in the minimum wage.

U.S. House of Representatives

Elections

2020 

After Representative Paul Cook retired, Obernolte ran for and won the seat for California's 8th congressional district with 56.1% of the vote over Democratic nominee Chris Bubser. He was sworn into Congress on January 3, 2021, and appointed Freshman Class Representative to the House Republican Policy Committee.

In September 2019, after Paul Cook announced his retirement from California's 8th congressional district, Obernolte announced his candidacy. The district covers most of the High Desert of San Bernardino County and Mono and Inyo Counties.

In February 2020, President Donald Trump endorsed Obernolte on Twitter.

In the November 2020 election, Obernolte defeated Democratic nominee Chris Bubser with 56.1% of the vote to Bubser's 43.9%.

Tenure 
On January 6, 2021, Obernolte voted not to count Arizona's and Pennsylvania's electoral votes in the 2020 United States presidential election, citing unilateral changes to election law made in those states by the judiciary or executive branch rather than the state legislature. He also voted against impeaching Trump for inciting his supporters to attack the Capitol on January 6. Obernolte voted against the creation of the January 6 commission.

Obernolte's first pieces of legislation to pass the House concerned the enabling of technological advancement. His Fellowship and Traineeship for Early Career AI Researchers Act and Next Generation Computing Research and Development Act were included in the bipartisan H.R. 2225, the National Science Foundation (NSF) For the Future Act, and H.R. 3593, the Department of Energy Science for the Future Act respectively. His first standalone legislation, H.R. 3533, passed the House in September 2021. It establishes occupational series for federal positions in software development, software engineering, data science, and data management.

In February 2021, Obernolte voted against the resolution that stripped Marjorie Taylor Greene of her committee assignments for her incendiary and violent statements. In November 2021, he voted against censuring Representative Paul Gosar, who posted an edited video of himself violently attacking Representative Alexandria Ocasio-Cortez and President Biden.

In February 2021, Obernolte voted against the Equality Act, a bill that would prohibit discrimination based on gender identity and sexual orientation by amending the Civil Rights Act of 1964 and the Fair Housing Act to include new protections.

In March 2021, he voted against the American Rescue Plan Act.

In June 2021, Obernolte voted to repeal the Authorization for Use of Military Force Against Iraq Resolution of 2002.

As of October 2021, Obernolte had voted in line with Joe Biden's stated position 20% of the time.

Committee assignments 
 Committee on Budget
 Committee on Natural Resources
 Committee on Science, Space and Technology

Caucus memberships 
 Republican Study Committee
 Republican Governance Group

Political positions

Abortion
Obernolte supported the overturning of Roe v. Wade and believes that because the Constitution does not mention abortion explicitly, states may outlaw it.

LGBT rights
On July 19, 2022, Obernolte and 46 other Republican representatives voted for the Respect for Marriage Act, which would codify the right to same-sex marriage in federal law. He said, "As an ardent advocate for limited government, I do not feel that government should be empowered to dictate the terms of a marriage."

Big Tech
In 2022, Obernolte was one of 39 Republicans to vote for the Merger Filing Fee Modernization Act of 2022, an antitrust package that would crack down on corporations for anti-competitive behavior.

Syria
In 2023, Obernolte was among 47 Republicans to vote in favor of H.Con.Res. 21 which directed President Joe Biden to remove U.S. troops from Syria within 180 days.

Electoral history

2014 California State Assembly election 

On February 10, 2014, Obernolte announced his candidacy for the California State Assembly to succeed Tim Donnelly in the 33rd district.

Obernolte was endorsed by the California Republican Party, the San Bernardino County Republican party, the California Republican Assembly, The Press-Enterprise, the Howard Jarvis Taxpayers Association, Peace Officers Research Association of California (PORAC), San Bernardino County Safety Employee's Benefit Association (SEBA), the California Conservative Christians, and the Independent Voter Political Action Committee.

In the June primary, Obernolte finished second with 18.89% of the vote with 7,887 votes. He defeated Democrat John Coffey in the November general election with 65.9% of the vote.

2016 California State Assembly election 

On January 25, 2016, Obernolte announced he would seek reelection as the representative for California's 33rd Assembly District.

In the June primary, Obernolte finished first with 60.7% of the vote with 43,526 votes. He defeated Democrat Scott Markovich in the November general election with 60.6% of the vote.

2018 California State Assembly election

2022 California Congressional election

Personal life
Obernolte married his wife, Heather, in 1996, and they have two sons. The family has lived in Big Bear Lake since 1997.

Obernolte holds an airline transport pilot's license. He is a certified flight instructor and has flown light aircraft since 2005. He worked with Embraer as a member on its Pilot Advisory Board during the development of the Phenom 300. Obernolte volunteers as a pilot with the Veterans Airlift Command and the Young Eagles.

Obernolte holds a fifth-degree black belt in Pacific Unified Martial Arts and is co-owner and instructor at PUMA Karate in Big Bear Lake.

References

External links

Representative Jay Obernolte official U.S. House website
 State Assembly website
 Jay Obernolte for Congress campaign website
 
 

|-

|-

1970 births
21st-century American politicians
American Christians
Businesspeople from California
California Institute of Technology alumni
Candidates in the 2020 United States elections
Living people
Mayors of places in California
Republican Party members of the California State Assembly
People from Fresno, California
People from Big Bear Lake, California
Politicians from Chicago
Republican Party members of the United States House of Representatives from California
University of California, Los Angeles alumni
Video game developers